Douglas Richard TenNapel (born July 10, 1966) is an American animator, writer, cartoonist, video game designer, and comic book artist whose work has encompassed animated television, video games, and comic books. He is best known for creating Earthworm Jim, a character that spawned a video game series, animated series, and a toy line. He is also the creator of the animated television series Catscratch (2005–2007), which aired on Nickelodeon, and was itself a loose adaptation of TenNapel's comic book limited series Gear.

Career
TenNapel began as an animator on Attack of the Killer Tomatoes: The Animated Series. He soon began working in the video game industry on projects like 1993's Jurassic Park and The Ren & Stimpy Show: Stimpy's Invention for the Sega Genesis and The Jungle Book for the SNES and Sega Genesis. In 1994, he created Earthworm Jim, the character that would star in Shiny Entertainment's video game, toy line, and cartoon series. Shiny Entertainment head David Perry later commented on working with TenNapel, "I wish I could find 100 Dougs, then I realized I was lucky to have been able to work with one. He is crazy talented, both crazy and talented! He also generates an enormous amount of amazing content and ideas, I wouldn’t be surprised if he sleeps with a sketch-book!" In 1995, he left Shiny Entertainment and founded his own company, Neverhood, with several other former Shiny employees. Working for DreamWorks Interactive, Neverhood created The Neverhood for the PC and PlayStation. The sequel, entitled Skullmonkeys, followed in 1998.

On television, TenNapel was the creator of the Project G.e.e.K.e.R. cartoon series for CBS. He was also a consulting producer on the ABC series Push, Nevada with Ben Affleck. Towards the end of the 2000s, he also created two shorts for Frederator Studios and Nicktoons, "Solomon Fix" (computer generated 3D) and "Squirly Town" (traditional 2D).

As a graphic artist and cartoonist, TenNapel released his first comic book in 1998: Gear, a surreal epic based on his real-life cats, Simon, Waffle, Gordon and Mr. Black, in a war against dogs and insects using giant robots as weapons. The cats from Gear would eventually become the Nickelodeon series Catscratch.

TenNapel did the cover art for several of Five Iron Frenzy's albums, including a sculpture for their live album, Proof That the Youth Are Revolting. TenNapel has also created album covers and artwork for several Daniel Amos CDs, The 1999 tribute to the band, When Worlds Collide, the Neverhood soundtrack Imaginarium: Songs from the Neverhood and others.

Flink, a graphic novel by TenNapel, was released in late 2007 through Image Comics. Monster Zoo was released in early summer 2008. In May 2009 his graphic novel Power Up was released.

Between January and October 2009, TenNapel was a regular contributor to Breitbart News' "Big Hollywood" section, covering topics from movie reviews and the state of the comics entertainment industry to criticisms of the Obama administration and the environmental movement.

In July 2010, his graphic novel Ghostopolis was released. In 2009, it was announced the book would be adapted into a film starring and produced by Hugh Jackman, but no update has been given since then.

TenNapel produced an episodic spoof of Japanese Super Sentai-style shows called Go Sukashi! based on a character by Shoko Nakagawa (who appears in the films), and starring John Soares and Brooke Brodack. He has also published an online superhero-genre-spoofing webcomic titled Ratfist.

In September 2012, Fox Animation optioned TenNapel's published Graphix novel Cardboard, with plans for actor Tobey Maguire's Material Pictures, graphic novelist Doug TenNapel, and the Gotham Group to be executive producers. Fox planned to have the picture developed under its WedgeWorks subsidiary. WedgeWorks director Chris Wedge (Ice Age) was producing, and considered directing the film as well. As of 2020, no update has been given on the film, especially given the acquisition of 21st Century Fox assets by The Walt Disney Company.

TenNapel has used Kickstarter to produce a bound collection of his sketches, named Sketchbook Archives.

TenNapel and other former members of the Earthworm Jim team at Pencil Test Studios launched a Kickstarter campaign in May 2013 to fund a PC game project called Armikrog, described a spiritual successor to The Neverhood and also being animated using clay animation techniques. It was successful, and reached its stretch goal for a Wii U version.

In 2018, TenNapel self-published the graphic novel Bigfoot Bill, launched as an Indiegogo, successfully funded and reaching various stretch goals.

In May 2019, TenNapel and other members of the original Earthworm Jim team announced a new Earthworm Jim game, to be released as an exclusive for the upcoming Intellivision Amico. He also self-published the graphic novel Earthworm Jim: Launch the Cow, again on Indiegogo. As of August 2019, Earthworm Jim: Launch the Cow is the second highest-grossing crowdfunded comic book of all time (US$816,000), trailing only The Order of the Stick Reprint on Kickstarter ($1.2 million) and overtaking the comic book anthology Ctrl+Alt+Del (US$665,000).

Personal life
He has been married to Angie since 1990. The couple have four children. TenNapel was personal friends with Andrew Breitbart prior to the latter's death.

Criticism and controversy

TenNapel has attracted criticism for his remarks on the LGBTQ community and its issues, including vocal opposition to same-sex marriage and intentionally misgendering a transgender journalist who criticized the Earthworm Jim video game.

He has dismissed this criticism, and has written that "transphobe (like homophobe) is a made-up word used to slander conservative people of faith with a mental condition, and is only used by SJWs". TenNapel was involved with Comicsgate, a campaign against diversity and progressivism in the superhero comics industry. Sean Gordon Murphy had drawn a cover for one of TenNapel's works, Bigfoot Bill 2, which he withdrew and issued an apology after being made aware of TenNapel's history of anti-LGBTQ comments. In response, TenNapel tweeted that it is "more important than ever that pro-family comic lovers support my work", stating his belief that LGBTQ people are waging a "culture war" against him.

Political views and beliefs

TenNapel supported Donald Trump's presidency and regularly posts his political opinions on various social media platforms. He has a YouTube channel owned by his son Ed called Doug In Exile where he talks about current political events usually from a conservative perspective.

Bibliography

Graphic novels

Web comics

Children's books

Filmography

Television

Video games

Discography

Cover art

References

Sources

External links

 
 www.TenNapel.com
 
 Doug TenNapel Sketchbook Archives at Kickstarter
 Scholastic Doug TenNapel author page

Living people
American animated film directors
American animated film producers
American cartoonists
American Christian writers
American comics artists
American people of Dutch descent
American male screenwriters
American male video game actors
American male voice actors
American storyboard artists
American television directors
American television producers
American television writers
American video game designers
Album-cover and concert-poster artists
DreamWorks Animation people
Nickelodeon people
American male television writers
Stop motion animators
Point Loma Nazarene University alumni
American voice directors
American male non-fiction writers
Video game artists
Showrunners
1966 births